Pesnica pri Mariboru is a settlement in northeastern Slovenia. It is the administrative centre of the Municipality of Pesnica.

History
The settlement started to develop with the arrival of the railway in the 19th century, and particularly developed after World War II. After 1945, Pesnica became the centre of the western Slovene Hills. The elementary school and preschool in Pesnica were built by the Germans during the war. Since 1994, Pesnica has been the seat of the Styria Technological Park.

Notable people
Notable people that were born or lived in Pesnica include:
 Jan Muršak (born 1988), hockey player
 Tone Partljič (born 1940), writer, screenwriter, and politician
 Ivo Štandeker (1961–1992), writer and journalist

References

External links 
 
 Pesnica pri Mariboru on Geopedia

Populated places in the Municipality of Pesnica